Hotel des Artistes is a historic residential building located at 1 West 67th Street in New York City near the west side of Central Park, Manhattan. Completed in 1917, the ornate 17-story, 119-unit Gothic-style building has been home to a long list of writers, artists, and politicians over the years.

History 
In 1914, a group of artists—including Walter Russell, Frank DuMond, Willard Metcalf, and Penrhyn Stanlaws—paid $250,000 to buy a parcel of land on the west side of Central Park with the plans of building Hotel des Artistes. At the outset, they planned to erect a 20-story building where 10 stories would be dedicated to artists' studio space and the other 10 would be dedicated to apartments.

Designed by George Mort Pollard, when it opened in 1917, the Hotel des Artistes boasted a large swimming pool, grand ballrooms, rooftop squash courts, a gym, and a restaurant. Apartments had as many as six rooms apiece, and many of the units featured 20-foot lofted ceilings. Kitchens were small, as tenants were able to use their dumbwaiters to receive meals prepared in a kitchen on the second floor. The building is also noted for its pastoral floor-to-ceiling paintings by Howard Chandler Christy, one of its earliest residents.

In 1971, the building transformed into a full co-operative after a new owner purchased it. Several longtime tenants were evicted after a lengthy court battle.

In 1975, violinist turned restaurateur George Lang took over the run-down ground-floor cafe and renovated it, bringing in new diners. Lang and his wife Gloria ran Cafe des Artistes until 2009, when they decided to close it during the recession. In 2011, it reopened under new management as the Leopard at des Artistes.

Noteworthy former residents 

 Rolf Armstrong
Peter Benchley
 Howard Chandler Christy
 Noël Coward
Harry Crosby: Writer Harry Crosby—nephew of J.P. Morgan—killed himself and his mistress, Josephine Bigelow, in the building in 1929.
 Charles Dana Gibson
 Frank DuMond
 Isadora Duncan
 Dean Fausett
Edna Ferber
 Joel Grey
 Elizabeth Hardwick (writer)
 Fannie Hurst: The novelist died in her apartment in the building in 1968.
Ellsworth Kelly
John Lindsey
 Peter Martins
 Willard Metcalf
 James Montgomery Flagg
 Alla Nazimova
 LeRoy Neiman
 Mike Nichols
 Gary Oldman
Jean Pigozzi
 Alice Pike Barney
Zasu Pitts
 Norman Rockwell
 Walter Russell
Gloria Schiff
 Penrhyn Stanlaws
Richard Thomas
 Rudolph Valentino
Margaret Widdemer
Alexander Wolcott

Appearances in film and TV 

 Audrey Rose (1977): Hotel des Artistes plays a prominent role in the supernatural drama Audrey Rose. The film's set designers re-created one of the building's apartments on a sound stage in Hollywood.

References 

1917 establishments in New York City
Residential buildings completed in 1917
Residential buildings in Manhattan
Gothic Revival architecture in New York City